This is a partial list of women who write experimental literature.

A

B

C

D

E

F

G

H

I-J

K
Anna Kavan

L

M

N-O

P-Q

R

S

T

U-W

X-Z

See also
Lists of writers
20th century in literature
20th century in poetry
21st century in literature
List of years in literature
List of avant-garde artists
Non-fiction
Fiction

References

Experimental